Sociocybernetics is an interdisciplinary science between sociology and general systems theory and cybernetics.  The International Sociological Association has a specialist research committee in the area – RC51 – which publishes the (electronic) Journal of Sociocybernetics.

The term "socio" in the name of sociocybernetics refers to any social system (as defined, among others, by Talcott Parsons and Niklas Luhmann).

Sociocybernetics aims to generate a general theoretical framework for understanding cooperative behavior in the context of a theory of evolution.

Sociocybernetics claims to include both what are called first order cybernetics and second order cybernetics. Cybernetics, according to Wiener's  definition, is the science of "control and communication in the animal and the machine". Heinz von Foerster went on to distinguish a first order cybernetics, "the study of observed systems", and a second order cybernetics, "the study of observing systems". Second order cybernetics is explicitly based on a constructivist epistemology and is concerned with issues of self-reference, paying particular attention to the observer-dependence of knowledge, including scientific theories.

See also

 Autopoiesis
 Cliodynamics
 Dynastic cycle
 General systems theory
 List of cycles
 Psychology
 Social cycle theory
 Sociocracy
 Sociology
 Superorganisms
 Systems philosophy
 Systems thinking
 War cycles
 World-systems theory

References

Further reading
 Béla H. Bánáthy (2000). Guided Evolution of Society: A Systems View. Kluwer Academic/Plenum, New York.
 Felix Geyer and Johannes van der Zouwen (1992). "Sociocybernetics" in: Handbook of Cybernetics (C.V. Negoita, ed.). New York: Marcel Dekker, 1992, pp. 95–124.
 
 
 Raven, J. (1994). Managing Education for Effective Schooling: The Most Important Problem Is to Come to Terms with Values. Unionville, New York: Trillium Press.
 Raven, J. (1995). The New Wealth of Nations: A New Enquiry into the Nature and Origins of the Wealth of Nations and the Societal Learning Arrangements Needed for a Sustainable Society. Unionville, New York: Royal Fireworks Press; Sudbury, Suffolk: Bloomfield Books.

External links
Sociocybernetics Research Committee RC51-ISA
Center for Sociocybernetics Studies Bonn
International Federation for Systems Research
Cybernetic Principles for Effective Control in Complex Organizations
Journal of Sociocybernetics

Cybernetics
Systems theory